Scappoose Airport may refer to:

 Scappoose Industrial Airpark, a public use airport in Scappoose, Oregon, United States (FAA: SPB)
 Chinook Ultralight Airpark, a private use airport in Scappoose, Oregon, United States (FAA: 52OR)
 Grabhorn's Airport, a private use airport in Scappoose, Oregon, United States (FAA: 8OR6)